Four Pillars of Basement is a 2015 Indian Hindi psychological thriller film directed by Girish Naik and produced by Gautam Bafana & Pravin Chudasama. The film stars Dilzan Wadia, Bruna Abdullah, Alia Singh and Shawar Ali in leading roles and was released on 6 November 2015.

Plot

On the night of Diwali, Riya (Aliya Singh) gets locked down in the basement of her office. She finds help in the form of Samir (Dilzan Wadia) who works as a security guard there, but soon comes to realize that Samir is not there to help her find a way out.

Production
Fair Deal Studios is producing the film. Song performances were filmed in Goa with the lead actors of the film. "Rehamo Karam" is a song shot in Goa and over a schedule of 15 days. "Tu Hai Gazab Soniye", starring Dilzan and Bruna, was shot in Baroda at the Dynamite lounges. Another major shooting schedule of the film was held in Surat at Rahul Raj mall, Baroda at K10 mall. Dilzan Wadia will launch 11-year-old singer Jayalakshmi.

Four Pillars of Basement is written by Rajan Safri (US), directed by Giresh Naik K and produced by Gautam Bafana and Pravin Chudasama. Javed Ali and Mudassir Ali have sung songs for the film and music is composed by Anurag Mohn.

Cast

 Dillzan wadia as Samir
 Bruna Abdullah as Bruna  
 Aliya Singh as Riya
 Zakir Hussain as DSP
 Shawar Ali as Jiju
 Imran Khan as Bhai
 Anant Jao as Sir
 Ehasan Khan as Rodrigues
 Ravi Gadariya as Kal

Soundtrack 

 
The soundtrack of Four Pillars of Basement consists of four songs composed by Mudasir Ali and Anurag Mohn, the lyrics of which have been written by Avinash Jaiswar, Pratyush Prakash and Shailey Bidwaiker.

Critical reception

Renuka Vyavahare of The Times of India gave the film a rating of 0.5 out of 5 and said that, "The film is a blatant scene-to-scene copy of Hollywood thriller P2 (2007). While the original film was mediocre itself, it seems remarkable compared to this one." Johnson Thomas of The Free Press Journal criticized the film saying that, "There’s little logic in the interplay and much less in the premeditated convolutions in the story telling that leads up to a suspect ending." Rajesh Kumar Singh of Bollywood Trade gave the film a rating of 0 out of 5 and said that, "The film seems to have been made to showcase the histrionic prowess of Dillzan Wadia who hams all the way to ignominy and ridicule. It’s an unimaginatively directed, written, photographed and edited film."

References

External links
 

2015 films
2010s Hindi-language films
Indian psychological thriller films